Kwajalein Atoll High School is a secondary school in Kwajalein, Marshall Islands. It is a part of the Marshall Islands Public School System.

The school serves the following atolls and islands: Kwajalein, Lae, Ujae, and Wotto.

References

Kwajalein Atoll
High schools in the Marshall Islands